The Canadian province of British Columbia first required its residents to register their motor vehicles in 1904. Registrants provided their own licence plates for display until 1913, when the province began to issue plates.

, plates are issued by the provincial motor vehicle insurer, the Insurance Corporation of British Columbia (ICBC). Front and rear plates are required for most classes of vehicles, while only rear plates are required for motorcycles and trailers.

Passenger baseplates

1913 to 1969 
The 1954 (dated 1955) issue was the first British Columbia licence plate that complied with these standards.

1970 to present 
British Columbia introduced an ABC-123 serial format on its passenger plates in 1970. A split-alphabet system was used, with each letter advancing from A through K, or from L through X (the letters I, O, Q, U, Y and Z were omitted). Serials were thus issued in the following eight series: AAA–KKJ, AAL–KKX, ALA–KXK, ALL–KXX, LAA–XKK, LAL–XKX, LLA–XXK and LLL–XXX. When the ABC-123 format was exhausted in 2001, a reversed format, 123-ABC, was introduced, with the same split-alphabet system and thus the same eight series. Upon the exhaustion of this format in 2014, an AB1-23C format was introduced, with the split-alphabet system discontinued and each letter thus advancing from A through X.

Truck plates 1973 to present 
The current standard truck plate is issued to both commercial and private trucks, and also to buses and taxis.

Non-passenger plates

Motorcycle plates

Antique plates

Other non-passenger

Consular plates 1967 to present

Specialty plates

2010 Olympics

BC Parks plates 
On November 28, 2016, British Columbia announced its new BC Parks Future Strategy. This included the issuance by the ICBC of special licence plates, with the proceeds going towards preserving BC Parks. The three new plates were unveiled by the ICBC on January 18, 2017, and went on sale January 29, 2017, through the Autoplan broker network. Each plate costs $50 for the initial purchase, of which $33 goes towards funding BC Parks; thereafter, there is an annual renewal fee of $40, all of which goes towards funding the parks system. In less than eight weeks since going on sale, it was reported that 10,000 BC Parks plates had been sold; this included all three designs.

Military Plates

Decals 

From 1970 until May 1, 2022, British Columbia required motorists to place a decal on the rear licence plate as proof of registration.

Initially, all decals expired on February 28 of the following year. When monthly staggered registration commenced in 1979, longer decals were introduced displaying the month of expiration; all such decals initially expired at the end of the month displayed. Daily registration commenced in 1993, with an additional decal introduced displaying the number of the day on which the month decal expired.

The decals were issued by the ICBC until the requirement was removed on May 1, 2022. The following are the colour patterns used in the years from 1980 to 2022:

See also 
 Insurance Corporation of British Columbia (ICBC)
 Symbols of British Columbia

References

External links 

 British Columbia licence plates, 1969–present
 A Pictorial History of British Columbia Licence Plates

1904 establishments in British Columbia
British Columbia
Transport in British Columbia
British Columbia-related lists